Essar Group is an Indian multinational conglomerate company, founded by Shashi Ruia and Ravi Ruia in 1969. As Essar Global Fund Limited (EGFL), the company controls a number of assets across the core sectors of energy (oil refining, oil and gas exploration, and production, power), infrastructure & logistics (ports, projects), metals & mining, technology and retail (oilfield services, IT, food retail). EGFL holds nearly 100% stake in all its investments.

Significant Essar Group companies include Essar Oil UK, Essar Ports, Essar Oil & Gas Exploration & Production, Essar Shipping, Essar Power, and Essar Projects.

History
In 1969, Shashi Ruia won a major contract worth Rs. 2.3 crore for the construction of an outer breakwater for Chennai port, thus laying the foundation of Essar Group.

In 1976, Essar purchased India's first private tanker for US$2 million.

In 1995, Essar Group entered the telecom sector with a Swiss PTT joint venture partnership branded as the Essar Cellphone. In the same year, Essar Group started GSM operations from Delhi. Essar independently, and in partnership with Hutchison (Hutchison Essar), subsequently acquired more telecom circles in India. By 2006, all the circles were under Hutchison Essar Limited.

In 2007, Essar owned The MobileStore, an Indian chain of telecom and mobile phone retail stores.

In 2017, Essar Steel India Ltd. (ESIL) was on the defaulter's list disclosed by the Reserve Bank of India. Essar Oil was acquired by a consortium led by Rosneft, Trafigura, and UCP for $12.9 billion, and Essar Oil was rebranded as Nayara Energy.

In November 2019, ArcelorMittal won approval from Supreme Court to takeover Essar Steel and pay the creditors with equal rights.

In March 2020, Essar Group was successful in cutting down the residual debt by 70% to about Rs. 12,000 crore.

In February 2021, Essar Power entered into the renewable energy venture by setting up a 90 MW solar plant in Madhya Pradesh.

In December 2021, Essar has set up Vertex Hydrogen under UK's HyNet project with Progressive Energy to help drive energy transition in the UK.

Business verticals
 Infrastructure & logistics
 Energy
 Technology & retail
 Metals & mining

Acquisitions
In 2003, Essar Group acquired Aegis Communication and spread across 13 countries. In 2014, Essar did the part sale of Aegis USA Inc. with annual revenue of $400 million to Teleperformance and in 2017 Essar left the outsourcing business by selling Aegis’ operations to Capital Square Partners (CSP).

Essar Steel acquired HGPL and SCGL from Stemcor in 2005 and became an integrated steel producer.

In 2007, Essar Global acquired a US-based steel company named Minnesota Steel LLC.

In 2011, Essar Energy purchased Stanlow Refinery in North West England for $350 million. Under Essar's leadership, the first phase of the turnaround of Stanlow refinery has been started during the financial year 2015–16 with $187 million net profit. Essar plans a £250 million expansion of Stanlow refinery, with over 16% production of transport fuels in the UK.

AGC Networks, a wholly-owned subsidiary of Essar Group, acquired Black Box Corporation in 2019.

Initiatives
During COVID-19 pandemic, Essar Foundation opened Covid Care Centre at Devbhumi Dwarka, Gujarat, organized vaccination drives, and provided meals to needy people.

See also
 Conglomerate companies of India
 Shipping Corporation of India
 Shashi and Ravi Ruia

References

External links
 

Essar Group
Multinational companies headquartered in India
Companies based in Mumbai
Indian companies established in 1969
Conglomerate companies established in 1969
1969 establishments in Maharashtra